John Lowe  (born 21 July 1945) is an English former professional darts player. Along with Eric Bristow and Jocky Wilson, he was known for dominating darts during the 1980s. Lowe was world champion on three occasions, in 1979, 1987 and 1993. He was also a two-time winner of the Winmau World Masters and a two-time World Cup singles champion. In total, Lowe won 15 BDO and WDF majors. He held the World No. 1 ranking on four occasions. In October 1984, he became the first player to hit a televised nine-dart finish. 

Lowe is one of only six players to have won the World Championship three or more times, and was the first person to win it in three separate decades; along with Phil Taylor, he remains one of only two players to achieve this. Amidst growing dissatisfaction with the British Darts Organisation, Lowe was also one of 16 players who in 1993 broke away to form their own governing body, the World Darts Council (now known as the Professional Darts Corporation).

Career
Lowe won the World Championship title in three different decades – 1979, 1987 and 1993. He met Eric Bristow six times in the World Championship in various semi-finals and finals, and it was not until his fourth attempt (in the 1987 final) that he managed to overcome his rival. His record against Bristow in majors was three wins and six defeats.

Lowe achieved the first ever televised nine-dart finish (the sport's equivalent of a 147 break in snooker) on 13 October 1984 during the World Matchplay tournament against Keith Deller, although it was not live and instead shown on a highlights programme on ITV. It was achieved via a rare third visit combination of treble 17, treble 18 and double 18. For the nine-dart finish, Lowe received £102,000. Lowe also went on to win the tournament, for which he received £12,000, and earned an additional £1,000 for tournament's highest outshot (161). This remained the highest amount of money earned by a darts player at a single tournament for almost two decades.

In addition to his three world titles, Lowe has also won two World Masters titles, two British Open titles, two British Matchplay championships, two World Cup Singles, and three European Cup Singles Titles, as well as other titles around the world in his career. He played for England over 100 times and was captain for seven years, during which time his team were unbeaten.

Lowe gained credit for his decorum and sportsmanship at the oche, often in contrast to Eric Bristow. Lowe was also probably unique in darts in that he looked after his health, never developing the weight difficulties associated with darts players, though he did consume alcohol onstage alongside other players when it was still permitted during matches.

Nicknames have always been common in darts, but Lowe never really had one which caught on. A composed performer, he did not have anything which stood out in his demeanour or personality – until someone decided to use these traits to come up with the nickname of "Old Stoneface". This is also the title of Lowe's autobiography which was published in 2005.

Lowe has enjoyed a longevity at the sport. He played in the televised stages of the World Championship for a then record 28 consecutive years, from the inaugural championship in 1978 to his last appearance in 2005 where he was defeated by the Canadian John Verwey in a final leg tie-break.

Lowe played at the Alexandra Palace in 1980 in front of 7,000 people in the News of the World Championship.

Lowe also dominated the British Pentathlon event, winning it ten times, including six in a row from 1982–1987. He stopped entering the event as the prizemoney had not changed in 12 years and it cost players £100 to enter, plus expenses.

Lowe was secretary of the World Professional Dart Players Association (later to become the Professional Dart Players Association (PDPA)), and in 2005, enjoyed a testimonial year in the sport to commemorate his 30th year as a professional. He attempted to qualify for the World Championship each year until 2008, but fell short in the early qualifying rounds. After joining a short-lived venture, the Setanta Sports-televised BetFred League of Legends in 2008, Lowe became ineligible to compete at the PDC World Championship so could not attempt to qualify for the 2009 event.

Post-darts career
In May 2009, Lowe released a book, The Art of Darts, in which he offered his personal insights into the game to both amateur and aspiring professional dart players. In 2013, The Art of Darts was produced in app-form for the iPhone and iPad.

In 2014, Lowe was one of several celebrities to take part in ITV's new game show Amazing Greys, in which members of the public take on icons of British sport and entertainment.

Personal life
Lowe was born in New Tupton, Derbyshire. He is married to Karen and lives in Chesterfield. They both support Sunderland football club.

World Championship results

BDO
1978: Runner-up (lost to Leighton Rees 7–11 legs)
1979: Winner (beat Leighton Rees 5–0 sets)
1980: 2nd round (lost to Cliff Lazarenko 0–2)
1981: Runner-up (lost to Eric Bristow 3–5)
1982: Runner-up (lost to Jocky Wilson 3–5)
1983: Quarter-finals (lost to Keith Deller 3–4)
1984: Semi-finals (lost to Eric Bristow 0–6)
1985: Runner-up (lost to Eric Bristow 2–6)
1986: Quarter-finals (lost to Bob Anderson 3–4)
1987: Winner (beat Eric Bristow 6–4)
1988: Runner-up (lost to Bob Anderson 4–6)
1989: Semi-finals (lost to Eric Bristow 1–5)
1990: 2nd round (lost to Ronnie Sharp 2–3)
1991: 1st round (lost to Peter Evison 2–3)
1992: Semi-finals (lost to Phil Taylor 4–5)
1993: Winner (beat Alan Warriner 6–3)

PDC
1994: Group Stage (beat Tom Kirby 3–2 and lost to Larry Butler 2–3)
1995: Semi-finals (lost to Phil Taylor 4–5)
1996: Semi-finals (lost to Phil Taylor 1–5)
1997: Last 24 group (lost to Jamie Harvey 2–3 and beat Paul Lim 3–1)
1998: Last 24 group (lost to Peter Manley 0–3 and lost to Gary Mawson 0–3)
1999: 2nd round (lost to Phil Taylor 1–3)
2000: Quarter-finals (lost to Dennis Smith 3–5)
2001: 2nd round (lost to Jamie Harvey 0–3)
2002: 2nd round (lost to Peter Manley 5–6)
2003: 2nd round (lost to Les Fitton 1–4)
2004: 3rd round (lost to Alan Warriner 3–4)
2005: 2nd round (lost to John Verwey 2–3)

WSDT
2022: 2nd round (lost to Dave Prins 0-3)

Career finals

BDO major finals: 25 (9 titles, 16 runners-up)

WDF major finals: 6 (5 titles, 1 runner-up)

Independent major finals: 1 (1 title)

Performance timeline

Nine-dart finishes

Lowe accomplished the first ever televised nine-dart finish. This finish was not broadcast live.

References

External links
Interview with John Lowe
John Lowe's profile and stats on Darts Database
John Lowe's Blog at Unicorn-Darts.com

English darts players
1945 births
Living people
BDO world darts champions
Sportspeople from Chesterfield, Derbyshire
Professional Darts Corporation founding players
People from Tupton
Sportspeople from Derbyshire
Members of the Order of the British Empire
Darts players who have thrown televised nine-dart games
Professional Darts Corporation Hall of Fame